The Topino is a river in Umbria, central Italy. It was known in ancient times as Supunna by Umbri and later in Latin as Tinia
 and is mentioned by Dante Alighieri in the Canto XI of the Paradise. It is the main tributary of the Chiascio, in the Tiber basin. It is about 50 km long, and its drainage basin covers 1,234 km2.

Topino's tributaries include the Menotre, the Clitunno (known as Timia past its confluence with Marroggia creek) and the Ose. After passing through the comuni of Valtopina, Foligno, Bevagna, Cannara and Bettona, it joins the Chiascio at Passaggio.

References

Rivers of Italy
Rivers of the Province of Perugia